Kid Dynamite  may refer to:

 Mike Tyson (born 1966), boxer nicknamed Kid Dynamite
 Lodewijk Parisius (1911-1963), Surinamese/Dutch jazz musician known as Kid Dynamite
 Kid Dynamite (film), a 1943 film directed by Wallace Fox and starring The East Side Kids
 Kid Dynamite (band) a Philadelphia-based hardcore punk band
Kid Dynamite (album), a 1998 eponymous album
 "Kid Dynamite" (song), the first single and lead track on Squirrel Bait's 1987 album Skag Heaven 
 Nickname of J. J. Evans, a character played by Jimmie Walker on the American television show Good Times
 Nickname of Gene Cordell, a character in The Street with No Name (1948)